The Cambridge Matignon School (originally Father Matignon High School) is a private, co-educational Roman Catholic college-preparatory school in Cambridge and Somerville, Massachusetts, United States. The school is under the auspices of the Roman Catholic Archdiocese of Boston.

Campus
The campus fronts on Matignon Road, Cambridge, extending into the city of Somerville at its rear. It consists of two school buildings: the main school building and a smaller alumni building containing development offices and art classrooms. The campus is adjacent to a church and a rectory. This church used to be the Roman Catholic Archdiocese of Boston's Immaculate Conception Church, but reopened in January 2006 as St. Sava Serbian Orthodox Church. The school also resides next to the International School of Boston.

History
The Cambridge Matignon School is named after Father Francis Anthony Matignon, who was born in Paris on November 10, 1753, and came to the United States after being ordained a priest. He died in 1818. In 1945, the high school was established by Richard Cardinal Cushing (then Archbishop of Boston). The school's 10 ice hockey state championships are second to Catholic Memorial High School in state history. The program has produced 19 NHL draft picks overall; however, its last tournament win was back in 2004.

Athletics
Girls' Basketball - League Champions 2006, 2007 & 2018
Boys Soccer - League Champions 2006, 2007, 2009 & 2011
Girls Soccer - League Champions 2009 & 2010
Boys Basketball - State Champions 1989, League Champions 2011 & 2017
Boys Golf - League Champions 2001, 2011, 2012 & 2016
Boys Baseball - League Champions 2009, 2010 & 2012
Boys Ice Hockey - State Champions 1975, 1977, 1980, 1981, 1982, 1983, 1984, 1987, 1988, 1993 (Runner up 1976, 1978, 1979, 1989, 1992, 1996) (semi-finalist 1991, 1997), North Finalist (2001, 2003, 2004)

Notable alumni

 Jack Concannon  former NFL player (Philadelphia Eagles, Chicago Bears, Green Bay Packers, Detroit Lions)
 The Most Rev. Robert Deeley  bishop of Roman Catholic Diocese of Portland
 Niko Dimitrakos  former NHL player (San Jose Sharks, Philadelphia Flyers, Ottawa Senators)
 Susan Dynarski   professor of public policy, education and economics at the University of Michigan.
 Bob Emery  NHL Draft pick (Montreal Canadiens) former NCAA player (Boston College), former NCAA head coach (Plattsburgh State) current Director of Men's Ice Hockey Operations (Merrimack)
 William Evans  Commissioner of the Boston Police Department
 Art Graham  former NFL player (New England Patriots)
 Joseph Xavier Grant  United States Army officer and a recipient of the United States military's highest decoration, the Medal of Honor, for his actions in the Vietnam War
 Steve Leach  former NHL player (Washington Capitals, Boston Bruins, St. Louis Blues, Carolina Hurricanes, Ottawa Senators, Phoenix Coyotes, and Pittsburgh Penguins)
 Jimmy LeBlanc  actor
 Rt. Rev. Richard Lennon  bishop of the Roman Catholic Diocese of Cleveland
 Shawn McEachern  former NHL player (Boston Bruins, Pittsburgh Penguins, Los Angeles Kings, Ottawa Senators and Atlanta Thrashers) 1996 World Cup winner, Olympian, Stanley Cup Champion
 Tom O'Regan  former NHL player (Pittsburgh Penguins)
 Timothy J. Toomey Jr.  politician (Massachusetts House of Representatives & Cambridge City Councilor)
 Brian Walsh  former professional hockey player with the WHA Calgary Cowboys
 Rick Blangiardi  Current Mayor of Honolulu, Hawaii.
 Badara Traore  NFL Player Arizona Cardinals. 2019 NCAA Football Champion with LSU Tigers.

References

External links

 
 Article On Matignon from August 2007

Schools in Middlesex County, Massachusetts
Catholic secondary schools in Massachusetts
Educational institutions established in 1945
1945 establishments in Massachusetts